The Battle of Comacchio in 809 was a naval battle between a Byzantine fleet dispatched from Venice and the Frankish garrison of the island of Comacchio. A Byzantine fleet from Constantinople under its commander Paul, the governor of Cephalonia, arrived in Venice by way of Dalmatia and sent a fleet detachment to anchor at Comacchio. They skirmished with the Franks, were defeated and retreated to Venice.

Footnotes

References 

 

800s conflicts
Comacchio
Comacchio
Battles in Emilia-Romagna
809